The 2011–12 season was Olympiacos's 53rd consecutive season in the Super League Greece and their 86th year in existence.

The season was one of the best of the club's history. The club reached UEFA Europa's League Round of 16, and won both titles (Super League and Greek Cup), while performing beautiful football.

Olympiacos finished 1st in the Greek Super League, winning the title for a second consecutive season.

Players

Current squad

Transfers

Summer

In:

Out:

Competitions

Super League Greece

League table

Results summary

Results by round

Matches 

1 Match awarded 0-3 by FA decision following severe crowd violence during the match.

Greek Cup

UEFA Champions League

Group stage

Group F

UEFA Europa League

Knockout phase

Round of 32

Round of 16

Team kit

References

External links 
 Official Website of Olympiacos Piraeus 

Olympiacos F.C. seasons
Olympiacos F.C.
Olympiacos
Olympiacos
Greek football championship-winning seasons